Cherepanikha is a rural locality (a village) in Markushevskoye Rural Settlement, Tarnogsky District, Vologda Oblast, Russia. The population was 16 as of 2002.

Geography 
Cherepanikha is located 24 km southeast of Tarnogsky Gorodok (the district's administrative centre) by road. Kriulya is the nearest rural locality.

References 

Rural localities in Tarnogsky District